The  is a Japanese railway line connecting Tōkai with Mihama within Aichi Prefecture. It is owned and operated by Meitetsu.

History
The Chita Electric Railway Co. opened the Otagawa - Kowaguchi section for passenger services, electrified at 1500 V DC, in 1931/32. Freight services commenced in 1933, and in 1935 the line was extended to Kowa.

The company merged with Meitetsu in 1943, and the section from Otagawa to Kowaguchi was duplicated between 1960 and 1974.

Panorama Super runs on only holidays.

Future plans 
Kagiya-nakaoike Station is a new station that will be built between Takayokosuka and Minami Kagiya. It is due to open by the end of 2023.

Stations

References

External links 

 Official website (in Japanese)

Rail transport in Aichi Prefecture
Kowa Line
1067 mm gauge railways in Japan